Streptomyces kurssanovii is a bacterium species from the genus of Streptomyces which has been isolated from soil in Russia. Streptomyces kurssanovii produces chitinase, N-(Phenylacetyl)-2-butenediamide and fumaramidmycin.

Further reading

See also 
 List of Streptomyces species

References

External links
Type strain of Streptomyces kurssanovii at BacDive -  the Bacterial Diversity Metadatabase	

kurssanovii
Bacteria described in 1958